AVID or Avid may refer to:
Avid Technology, an American audio/video technology company
Advancement Via Individual Determination (AVID), an American organisation training educators to prepare students for college
Avid, a variant of the male given name Abid
Avid Merrion, protagonist in the Bo' Selecta! British TV show
Avid Home Entertainment, a division of Artisan Entertainment, a defunct American independent movie studio
 AVID, brand by SRAM Corporation.